Daniel Filipe Bandeira e Silva (born 11 April 2000) is a Portuguese professional footballer who plays as a midfielder for the Primeira Liga club Vitória Guimarães.

Club career
Silva is a youth product of the academies of Monte Caparica AC, Benfica, Belenenses, Vitória Setúbal and Vitória Guimarães. He began his senior career with Vitória Guimarães B where he became captain, before promoting to the senior team in 2022 and signing a professional contract on 13 April 2022. He made his professional debut with Vitória Guimarães in a 1–1 Primeira Liga tie with Boavista on 6 May 2022, coming on as a substitute in the 69th minute.

International career
Silva is a youth international for Portugal, and represented the Portugal U19s at the 2019 UEFA European Under-19 Championship.

References

External links
 
 

2000 births
Living people
People from Beja, Portugal
Portuguese footballers
Portugal youth international footballers
Association football midfielders
Vitória S.C. players
Vitória S.C. B players
Primeira Liga players
Campeonato de Portugal (league) players